Fuerza Aérea Glacier is a glacier on Greenwich Island in the South Shetland Islands, Antarctica, extending  in a northeast–southwest direction and  in a southeast–northwest direction and draining the northwest slopes of the Breznik Heights to flow northwestwards into Discovery Bay.

It was named "Glaciar Fuerza Aérea" (Air Force Glacier) by the 1947 Chilean Antarctic Expedition for the Chilean Air Force.

Location

Maps
 L.L. Ivanov et al. Antarctica: Livingston Island and Greenwich Island, South Shetland Islands. Scale 1:100000 topographic map. Sofia: Antarctic Place-names Commission of Bulgaria, 2005.
 L.L. Ivanov. Antarctica: Livingston Island and Greenwich, Robert, Snow and Smith Islands. Scale 1:120000 topographic map.  Troyan: Manfred Wörner Foundation, 2009.

References

 SCAR Composite Antarctic Gazetteer.
 

Glaciers of Greenwich Island